The name Keith was used for two tropical cyclones in the Atlantic Ocean.

 Tropical Storm Keith (1988), affected Central America and Florida, causing $7.3 million in damages.
 Hurricane Keith (2000), a Category 4 hurricane that caused extensive damage in Central America, particularly in Belize and Mexico.

The name Keith was retired after the 2000 season due to the extensive damages and loss of life it caused along its track. It was replaced with Kirk for the 2006 season.

Keith was also used to name one tropical cyclone in the Western Pacific Ocean.
 Typhoon Keith (1997), a super typhoon which affected Guam and the Northern Mariana islands, causing $15 million in damages.

Keith was also used to name one tropical cyclone in the Australian region.
 Cyclone Keith (1977)

Atlantic hurricane set index articles
Pacific typhoon set index articles
Australian region cyclone set index articles